Japan is the country that is most affected by natural disasters mainly due to it being in the Ring of Fire. Two out of the five most expensive natural disasters in recent history have occurred in Japan, in 1995 and 2011, costing $181 billion. Japan has also been the site of some of the 10 worst natural disasters of the 21st century. Many types of natural disasters occur in Japan such as tsunamis, floods, typhoons, earthquakes, cyclones, and even volcanic eruptions. The country has gone through thousands of years of natural disasters, affecting its economy, development, and social life. Some other major disasters in Japan were more recent, such as the January 1995 Great Hanshin earthquake and the March 2011 Tōhoku earthquake and tsunami, which triggered the Fukushima Daiichi nuclear disaster.

Volcanic eruptions

Many volcanic eruptions have taken place in Japan.

List of major volcanic eruptions

VEI-7 Volcanic eruptions

There are three VEI-7 volcanoes in Japan. These are the Aira Caldera, Kikai Caldera and Aso Caldera.

Mount Aso is the largest active volcano in Japan. Mount Aso had four eruptions 300,000 to 90,000 years ago. It emitted huge amounts of volcanic ash that covered all of Kyushu and up to Yamaguchi Prefecture.

Earthquakes
Japan has had a long history of earthquake catastrophe and seismic activity. In the past twenty years, the most severe earthquake that occurred was the 2011 Tohoku earthquake and tsunami.

''

List of recent earthquakes in Japan

Mudslides 
A mudslide, or mudflow, occurs when rocks, sand, and earth are loosened and fall from hills and mountains due to earthquake, rain or snow. In Japan, over two-thirds of the land is mountainous and therefore prone to mudslides.

Major mudslide events 
Japan has experienced several major mudslide events, often due to other natural disasters.

Mount Ontake 
On September 14, 1984, the Otaki earthquake (magnitude 6.8) in Nagano Prefecture, Japan, caused a major mudslide on the south face of Mount Ontake, which reached speeds of 80~100 km/h. Heavy rain over several days prior to the quake contributed to causing the mudslide, known as “Ontake Kuzure,” which took the lives of 29 people. After the disaster, barriers against mudslide were erected in nine locations at the foot of Mt. Ontake.

Wakayama & Nara 
In September 2011, Tropical Storm Talas (2011), which formed and was named on August 25, made landfall over Japan, bringing heavy rain to the mountainous Kii Peninsula, and causing a mudslide, called “Shinsohokai,” in Wakayama and Nara. "Shinsohokai" means that not only soil collapses, but also bedrock. In this case, houses were covered with earth and sand from the mudslide and there were many injured and killed.

Hiroshima 
In June 2010, Hiroshima experienced heavy rains which caused severe damage, including mudslides and river floods; Shōbara had 64 mm rain in an hour and Hiroshima had 30–50 mm on June 12, 20-40mm on the 13th and 20-50mm on the 14th. Five people were killed and six injured; 1,787 houses were destroyed.

Floods 
Floods and tsunamis are imbedded in Japanese culture and history. Southern parts of some regions are under sea level like Kyushu, Shikoku and the Okinawa-region. Rising oceans are also making the Tokyo metropolitan area, home to 38 million people, vulnerable to storm surges. Even as major flood management project open up the formerly industrial waterfront to new homes and businesses. Years of pumping up groundwater have caused some parts of the city to sink nearly 5 meters over the past century. This means that large parts of Tokyo are now below sea level and are only protected by outdated dikes.  

With a population of 127 million, the population density is very high. Most residential and industrial areas are located in low-lying areas, along rivers; these areas are very vulnerable to river flooding and flash floods. According to a 1985 study, 49 percent of the population and 75 percent of businesses are located in flood-prone areas. Given population growth in the Kanto Plain, where Japan's second-longest river, the Tone, is located, these shares are likely higher today. Water pushed to shore by strong winds or typhoons and coinciding with tide can cause significant sea level rise. These kinds of situations are then called a storm surge. In addition, precipitation is an increasing cause of flooding in Japan.

Flood management 
Flood management has been important in Japan for generations. The first form of flood management dates back to the 4th century when the Manda Levee (embankment) was built at the Yodo River. Here a narrow path runs along the old river near the inhabited areas. Today there is even a monument. Japan has many large-scale projects to protect its inhabitants from the water. For example, there is a lot of emphasis on breaking high waves and a lot of research is being done into the behavior of tsunamis. After the devastating tsunami of 2011, the Japanese government decided to protect all vulnerable villages and towns along the coast by building sea walls that range from 8.5 meters to 24 meters in height. As much as eleven billion is spent on building this 400-kilometer-long concrete wall.
Inland, flood management in Japan is also important against river flooding. Many of these projects are also recognizable to us. They are working on widening the river channels and building dikes. This is to limit the rise in a river's water level by increasing its cross-section and to prevent the land from flooding in times of flooding. They have drainage basins, which are used to temporarily store the overflow of the river during a flood and to drain it again after the risk of flooding has passed. This prevents the downstream water levels from rising. They also have pumping stations, here pumps are used to drain rainwater into the river in areas where the water level in the river is higher than the land. They also dredge in Japan. This is done to lower the water level in a river by deepening or dredging the river bed. Another important way of flood management is to create so-called shortcuts or shortcuts. The length of a river channel is shortened by straightening bends, so that flood water can flow through it quickly. And a flood management approach widely used by Japan is dams, such as the 186 meter high Kurobe Dam in Toyama. These dams are huge, so it often takes years to build them. The function of these dams is to regulate the water flow upstream at the time of a flood, so that the flow is reduced downstream.

Heatwaves 
Heatwaves have become increasingly common in Japan. June 2022 has seen the worst heatwave in 150 years.

See also
 List of disasters in Japan by death toll

References

External links
Recent natural disasters in Japan-日本では最近の自然災害